The National Live Music Awards of 2020 are the upcoming 5th annual National Live Music Awards. 

The nominees will be revealed on 7 September 2020, which is when general public voting commences. The event is scheduled for 20 October 2020.

The 2020 awards are set to "celebrate the resilience of the live music sector in the wake of the COVID-19 pandemic". More than 40 awards have been sidelined from 2019s event, in part due to the difficulties of recognising an industry that was unable to tour for half of the eligibility period. Two new, permanent awards are being added to the event; the first, the finest work by Live Music Journalists in Australia and the second, Best International Tour, will award an Australian promoter for their work on an Australian tour, fronted by an International guest. In July 2020, founding board member Damian Cunningham said "The NLMAs is back to honour not only the fantastic artists and acts that have performed in Australia this year, but to shine a light on excellent the work done within the industry as response to the Covid-19 pandemic. This year has highlighted difficulties and hurdles never before seen within our industry which has had devastating effects. But as always, we have risen high and responded across the board, be it within TV or internet based concerts to drive-in style gigs. This industry is one that responds to any situation."

National awards
Nominations and wins below. 

Live Act of the Year

Live Voice of the Year

Live Bassist of the Year

Live Drummer of the Year

Live Guitarist of the Year

Live Instrumentalist of the Year

Best Live Music Festival or Event

Best Live Music Photographer of the Year

Best Live Music Journalist of the Year

Best International Tour in Australia

Industry Special Achievement

Musicians Making a Difference

State and Territory awards
Note: The State and Territory awards are public voted, and for 2020, a single award for each state and territory will be awarded; the Best Live Act. Voting for these awards ran from 7 September - 24 September.

References

2020 in Australian music
2020 music awards
National Live Music Awards